Lithographa is a genus of lichenized fungi in the family Xylographaceae. The genus was circumscribed in 1857 by Finnish botanist William Nylander, with Lithographa petraea assigned as the type species. This species is now known as Lithographa tesserata.

Species
Lithographa graphidioides 
Lithographa olivacea 
Lithographa opegraphoides 
Lithographa serpentina 
Lithographa skottsbergii 
Lithographa tesserata

References

Baeomycetales
Baeomycetales genera
Lichen genera
Taxa named by William Nylander (botanist)
Taxa described in 1857